Borj-e Mohammadan (also Romanized as Borj-e Moḩammadān; also known as Borj-e Moḩammad, Borj, Borj Mohammad, and Burj) is a village in Afin Rural District, Zohan District, Zirkuh County, South Khorasan Province, Iran. At the 2006 census, its population was 213, in 59 families.

References 

Populated places in Zirkuh County